Charities Commission or Charity Commission may refer to:

 Australian Charities and Not-for-profits Commission
 Charities Commission (New Zealand), the former name of Charities Services
 Charity Commission for England and Wales, the non-ministerial government department that regulates registered charities in England and Wales
 Charity Commission for Northern Ireland, the independent regulator of Northern Ireland charities

See also
 Office of the Scottish Charity Regulator, a non-ministerial department of the Scottish Government with responsibility for the regulation of charities in Scotland